Callimetopus ruficollis is a species of beetle in the family Cerambycidae. It was described by Heller in 1915. It is known from the Philippines.

References

Callimetopus
Beetles described in 1915